Monarchy of Ceylon may refer to:
List of Sri Lankan monarchs
The Sinhalese monarchy
The period of Sri Lankan history in which the Dominion of Ceylon shared a monarch with the United Kingdom.